The 1988–89 NBA season was the 43rd season of the National Basketball Association. The season ended with the Detroit Pistons winning the NBA Championship, sweeping the Los Angeles Lakers. This was the first season of the Miami Heat and Charlotte Hornets.

Notable occurrences

The NBA adopts the three-official system used in college basketball permanently. The league experimented with three officials per game in 1978–79, but went back to two officials per game for the next nine seasons, although they actually have three with the inclusion of an alternate referee for all playoff games and selected regular season games.
The Charlotte Hornets and Miami Heat become the league's 24th and 25th franchises.
The Heat plays its inaugural season in the Midwest Division. As a result, the Sacramento Kings move to the Pacific Division.
The Hornets play their inaugural season in the Atlantic Division.
The 1989 NBA All-Star Game was played at the Astrodome in Houston, Texas, with the West defeating the East 143–134. Karl Malone of the Utah Jazz takes home the game's MVP award.
New Arenas: The Milwaukee Bucks move from the MECCA Arena to the then-Bradley Center, the Sacramento Kings move from ARCO Arena I to the then-ARCO Arena (later Power Balance Pavilion, now Sleep Train Arena), and the Detroit Pistons move from the Pontiac Silverdome to The Palace of Auburn Hills.
Michael Jordan records ten triple-doubles in eleven games near the end of the season.
Prior to the season, the first-year Hornets announce that they choose teal as their primary color, which gave them immediate attention. In the next decade, expansion teams in the other professional sports leagues (most notably the San Jose Sharks of the NHL, the Florida Marlins of Major League Baseball's NL, and the Jacksonville Jaguars of the NFL) further popularized the use of the color. The Hornets also popularized the use of pinstripes on the uniforms, which were later adopted by the Orlando Magic, Chicago Bulls (alternates only), Toronto Raptors, Indiana Pacers and the current Charlotte Hornets' predecessor franchise, the Bobcats.
The Chicago Bulls started a playoff tradition by wearing black sneakers. Prior to that, the Boston Celtics were the only team to wear black sneakers. Following the Bulls' unlikely playoff run, other teams began adopting the style, beginning with the Philadelphia 76ers in 1990.
This was Kareem Abdul-Jabbar's last season.
The Los Angeles Lakers became the first team to sweep two consecutive best-of-seven series.
The Celtics, who had never won fewer than 57 games in any of the previous nine seasons, slump to 42 as Larry Bird played only six games due to injuries.
The Indiana Pacers had four different head coaches during the season, a rare occurrence that has not happened since.
Seattle SuperSonics guard Dale Ellis won the All-Star game's 3-point shootout.
The first postponement of an NBA game due to a civil disturbance. In the wake of the Miami riots, the game between the Miami Heat and Phoenix Suns on January 17, 1989, was postponed.
Utah Jazz coach Frank Layden, citing burnout, resigns from the Jazz after 17 games and an 11-6 record.  Assistant Jerry Sloan begins the first season of 23 for the Utah Jazz, the longest tenure of any professional coach for one city and franchise.
This was the only season for Ricky Berry, who was selected by the Sacramento Kings with the 18th overall pick in the 1988 NBA draft, who committed suicide during the off-season.
 On January 6, 1989, the Bullets franchise played its first regular season game in Baltimore since 1973; this was the first of 35 regular season "home" games the Bullets played in Baltimore through the 1996–97 season.
Akeem Olajuwon becomes the only player in NBA history to accumulate over 200 steals with over 200 blocks in a season.

1988–89 NBA changes
 The Detroit Pistons moved into The Palace of Auburn Hills.
 The Los Angeles Clippers changed their jersey number colors on their road uniforms from blue to white.
 The Milwaukee Bucks moved into the Bradley Center (now as BMO Harris Bradley Center).
 The Sacramento Kings moved into ARCO Arena II (now as Sleep Train Arena).
 The Washington Bullets split home games at the Capital Centre and the Baltimore Arena during the season.

Final standings

By division

By conference

Notes
z – Clinched home court advantage for the entire playoffs
c – Clinched home court advantage for the conference playoffs
y – Clinched division title 
x – Clinched playoff spot

Expansion
The League expands from twenty-three to twenty-five franchises,  with new expansion teams in Charlotte and Miami.

The Heat began its season as a member of the Western Conference despite its geographical position, enduring its longest road trips when playing Western Conference teams. It also began the season 0–17, at the time the worst start in NBA history. The Hornets finished at 20–62. Such records are typical of expansion NBA franchises in their initial seasons, with 15–67 being the poorest record repeated by the Cavaliers, Grizzlies, Rockets, and Mavericks, as well as the Heat. The Sacramento Kings were belatedly moved to the Pacific Division in their fourth season after leaving Kansas City.

Playoffs

Teams in bold advanced to the next round. The numbers to the left of each team indicate the team's seeding in its conference, and the numbers to the right indicate the number of games the team won in that round. The division champions are marked by an asterisk. Home court advantage does not necessarily belong to the higher-seeded team, but instead the team with the better regular season record; teams enjoying the home advantage are shown in italics.

Statistics leaders

NBA awards
Most Valuable Player: Magic Johnson, Los Angeles Lakers
Rookie of the Year: Mitch Richmond, Golden State Warriors
Defensive Player of the Year: Mark Eaton, Utah Jazz
Sixth Man of the Year: Eddie Johnson, Phoenix Suns
Most Improved Player: Kevin Johnson, Phoenix Suns
Coach of the Year: Cotton Fitzsimmons, Phoenix Suns

All-NBA First Team:
F – Karl Malone, Utah Jazz
F – Charles Barkley, Philadelphia 76ers
C – Akeem Olajuwon, Houston Rockets
G – Michael Jordan, Chicago Bulls
G – Magic Johnson, Los Angeles Lakers

All-NBA Second Team:
F – Tom Chambers, Phoenix Suns
F – Chris Mullin, Golden State Warriors
C – Patrick Ewing, New York Knicks
G – John Stockton, Utah Jazz
G – Kevin Johnson, Phoenix Suns

All-NBA Third Team:
F – Dominique Wilkins, Atlanta Hawks
F – Terry Cummings, Milwaukee Bucks
C – Robert Parish, Boston Celtics
G – Dale Ellis, Seattle SuperSonics
G – Mark Price, Cleveland Cavaliers

NBA All-Rookie First Team:
Rik Smits, Indiana Pacers
Willie Anderson, San Antonio Spurs
Mitch Richmond, Golden State Warriors
Charles D. Smith, Los Angeles Clippers
Hersey Hawkins, Philadelphia 76ers

NBA All-Rookie Second Team:
Rex Chapman, Charlotte Hornets
Kevin Edwards, Miami Heat
Chris Morris, New Jersey Nets
Brian Shaw, Boston Celtics
Rod Strickland, New York Knicks

NBA All-Defensive First Team:
Dennis Rodman, Detroit Pistons
Larry Nance, Cleveland Cavaliers
Mark Eaton, Utah Jazz
Michael Jordan, Chicago Bulls
Joe Dumars, Detroit Pistons

NBA All-Defensive Second Team:
Kevin McHale, Boston Celtics
A. C. Green, Los Angeles Lakers
Patrick Ewing, New York Knicks
John Stockton, Utah Jazz
Alvin Robertson, San Antonio Spurs

Player of the week
The following players were named NBA Player of the Week.

Player of the month
The following players were named NBA Player of the Month.

Rookie of the month
The following players were named NBA Rookie of the Month.

Coach of the month
The following coaches were named NBA Coach of the Month.

References